This is a list of fountains in Bern. The city of Bern, Switzerland, is known for its 16th century fountains, attributed to Hans Gieng.

For a description of the 16th century fountains, see the Old City of Bern.

References

External links
 

 
Fountains in Switzerland
Fountains in Bern
Fountains, Bern
Bern